Laurent Richard is a French journalist, documentary filmmaker and producer. He is the founder of Forbidden Stories. He was awarded the European Journalist of the Year by Prix Europa. He is a Pulitzer Center on Crisis Reporting grantee.

References 

French journalists
Living people
Year of birth missing (living people)